Kundert is a surname. Notable people with the surname include:

Alice Kundert (1920–2013), American politician
Andreas Kundert (born 1984), Swiss hurdler
František Kundert (1891–1957), Czech cyclist
Gust Kundert (1913–2000), American politician
Otto Kundert (1888–1950), American politician